Tragic Serenade (Italian: Serenata tragica) is a 1951 Italian drama film directed by Giuseppe Guarino.

The film's sets were designed by Alfredo Montori. It was made at the Cinecittà Studios in Rome.

Cast
 Ignazio Balsamo 
 Carlo Giustini as don Peppino  
 Laura Gore as Zia di Margherita 
 Giovanni Grasso 
 Folco Lulli as Don Vincenzo Matturini  
 Silvia Moguet 
 Giancarlo Nicotra 
 Giovanna Pala
 Luigi Pavese 
 Dori Romano 
 Renato Della Torre 
 Mirella Uberti as Margherita  
 Mario Vitale

References

Bibliography
 Emiliano Morreale. Così piangevano: il cinema melò nell'Italia degli anni Cinquanta. Donzelli Editore, 2011.

External links
 

1951 films
1950s Italian-language films
Italian drama films
1951 drama films
Films directed by Giuseppe Guarino
Italian black-and-white films
1950s Italian films